The Men's 1,500m T11 had its first round held on September 13, beginning at 11:40 and the Final on September 15, at 18:39.

Medalists

Results

References
Round 1 - Heat 1
Round 1 - Heat 2
Round 1 - Heat 3
Final

Athletics at the 2008 Summer Paralympics